On the Inside is a 2012 thriller film written and directed by D.W Brown. The film was released on DVD and Blu-Ray on July 24, 2012.

Plot
Allen Meneric (Nick Stahl) is sent to a hospital for the criminally insane to be evaluated after he brutally murders his girlfriend’s alleged rapist. He very quickly becomes surrounded by evil psychopaths, people with seemingly mild personality disorders, sarcastic guards and indifferent doctors.
 
In a courtyard Allen has a chance meeting with Ben (Pruitt Taylor Vince). Ben's outgoing pleasant nature helps to initiate a friendship with Allen who is more inclined to keep to himself. Ben's state of mind, however, fluctuates and leads to endless droning, short-term memory loss, and occasional catatonic episodes as the film progresses.
 
Ben introduces Allen to Carl Tarses (Dash Mihok) who strikes fear into everyone he meets. He has deeply rooted emotional problems from parental abuse in his childhood. Terrorizing people gives Carl a sinister form of satisfaction. Things erupt between Carl and Allen after Carl describes some of his prior heinous acts to him.
 
Allen's good behavior gets him transferred to a minimum security section of the hospital where low risk males and females are able to interact. There he meets Mia (Olivia Wilde) who is both beautiful and bipolar. Mia and Allen instantly fall for each other and their budding romance causes them to smile and laugh for the first time. In a tragic twist of fate, Allen and Mia's private encounter, arranged by Mrs. Standings (Joanne Baron), a sincere and caring staff member, is violently interrupted by Tarses as he attempts to escape from the hospital.

Production

All of the filming took place in Pittsburgh in the Prospect Street School in the city's Mt. Washington neighborhood. Originally titled “In Northwood,” the film was renamed as part of the producer’s effort to shift the focus away from the facility where Allen Meneric (Nick Stahl) was committed to the demons lurking in the minds of all of the characters in the story.

Cast

Reception
Thomas Spurlin of DVDTalk said of the film: "Brown's film lacks the convincing expressive tension and thematic point it needs around the story's shocking turns to justify its gritty psychological approach, one wanting to latch onto a statement about innocuous persons within institutions that doesn't materialize." Mike Gencarelli gave the film three out of five stars, saying: "It was a decent surprise overall."

References

External links
 
 

2012 films
2012 direct-to-video films
2010s English-language films